La Strada is a musical with lyrics and music by Lionel Bart, with additional lyrics by Martin Charnin and additional music by Elliot Lawrence. It is based on the 1954 film of the same name by Federico Fellini.  Bart wrote the score in 1967 and made a demonstration recording, although the musical was not produced until 1969, when it was famously cancelled after just one performance.  The musical's book was written by Charles K. Peck, Jr., who also produced it on Broadway.

Plot summary
The play follows the story of the film of the same name. Gelsomina, a young girl, is sold by her impoverished mother to a brutish circus strongman, Zampanò, to be his assistant. She shows her abilities as a clown and soon becomes the star of the show. She falls in love with Zampanò, despite his abuse of her.  But tragedy strikes when she befriends Mario, a circus clown, who gives her advice and friendship, and Zampanò kills him in a jealous fit.  Zampanò eventually leaves Gelsomina, who still loves him, to die on the road.

Characters and original Broadway cast
 Gelsomina – Bernadette Peters
 Zampano – Stephen Pearlman
 Mother – Anne Hegira
 Mario – Larry Kert
 Elsa – Lisa Belleran
 Eva – Mary Ann Robbins
 Sophia – Susan Goeppinger
 Castra – Lucille Patton

Musical numbers

Act I
 Seagull, Starfish, Pebble – Gelsomina
 The Great Zampano – Gelsomina and Zampano
 What's Going on Inside? – Zampano
 Belonging – Gelsomina
 Wedding Dance – Company
 I Don't Like You – Gelsomina
 Encounters – Gelsomina and Company
 There's a Circus in Town – Mario
 You're Musical – Mario and Gelsomina
 Only More! – Gelsomina

Act II
 What a Man – Gelsomina and Mama Lambrini
 Everything Needs Something – Gelsomina
 Sooner or Later – Mario
 Sooner or Later (reprise) – Gelsomina
 Belonging (reprise) – Gelsomina
 The End of the Road – Company

Production, background and recordings
Lionel Bart and Chris Curtis produced a concept album of the proposed show in 1967 with Madeline Bell as Gelsomina. The musical had out-of-town tryouts at the Fisher Theatre in Detroit, Michigan starting on October 27, 1969. La Strada opened on December 14, 1969 at the Lunt-Fontanne Theatre on Broadway after 14 previews. The show was directed by Alan Schneider, with choreography by Alvin Ailey and Joyce Trisler. It closed the same night, losing $650,000.

In discussing La Strada'''s problems, Steven Suskin wrote that Bart apparently did not go to the United States to assist during rehearsals, and neither the director nor the choreographers had previously done a Broadway musical. Peters confirmed that Bart never worked on the show in New York: "The script really wasn't ready, and Lionel Bart was never coming over. Marty Charnin and his partner at the time [Lawrence] rewrote it." Ken Mandelbaum wrote about La Strada in his book, Not Since Carrie: Forty Years of Broadway Flops. During try-outs, Vincent Beck as Zampano, the strongman, was replaced. All but three of the original songs from the concept album were replaced. Furthermore, "it followed a relentlessly bleak, tragic screenplay, [and] it emerged as one of the most depressing musicals ever. ... Bernadette Peters, in her first Broadway lead, did not let the show down. ... The score was not bad, particularly Peters' haunting opening "Seagull, Starfish, Pebble", written by Lawrence and Charnin".

Although bootleg live recordings of the score are known to exist, no original cast album was commercially released. Two songs from the show were later included on an EP titled Martin Charnin's Mini Album: 5 Great Songs from Not-So-Great Shows (1976). One of these songs, "Sooner or Later" was performed by Larry Kert, who had been an original cast member. A recording of "Starfish", as performed by Judy Kuhn, was included on the anthology Unsung Musicals, released by Varèse Sarabande in 1994.

Critical responses
In his review in The New York Times'', Clive Barnes wrote that the book was superficial and the music bland and trite. However, he praised Peters, writing "In a different show the birdlike and croaky Bernadette Peters would have become a star overnight."

References

Sources
Mandelbaum, Ken (1991), "Not Since Carrie: Forty Years of Broadway Flops", St. Martin's Press,

External links
 
 Information about the musical and the 1967 recording

Broadway musicals
1969 musicals
Musicals based on films
Adaptations of works by Federico Fellini